The men's C-1 500 metres event was an open-style, individual canoeing event conducted as part of the Canoeing at the 1984 Summer Olympics program.

Medallists

Results

Heats
13 competitors were entered. Held on August 6, the top three finishers in each heat moved on to the semifinals with the others were relegated to the repechages.

Repechages
Repechages were held on August 6 with the top three finishers in each repechage advancing to the semifinals.

Semifinals
Three semifinals were held on August 8 with the top three finishers of each semifinal advancing to the final.

Final
The final took place on August 10.

References
1984 Summer Olympics official report Volume 2, Part 2. p. 366. 
Sports-reference.com 1984 C-1 500 m results.

Men's C-1 500
Men's events at the 1984 Summer Olympics